() are the Chilean national law enforcement police, who have jurisdiction over the entire national territory of the Republic of Chile. Created in 1927, their mission is to maintain order and enforce the laws of Chile. They reported to the Ministry of National Defense through the Undersecretary of Carabineros until 2011 when the Ministry of the Interior and Public Security gained full control over them. They are in practice separated fully from the three other military branches by department but still are considered part of the armed forces. Chile also has an investigative police force, the Investigations Police of Chile, also under the Interior and Public Security Ministry; a Maritime Police also exists for patrol of Chile's coastline.

History

Later, cities such as Santiago and Valparaíso created their own city police forces. In 1881 the Rural Police was created for the rural areas of the country. However, the main problem with these police services was that they were dependent on local authorities for day-to-day decision making. This led to local officials abusing this power for their own political ends. In 1896 the Fiscal Police was created to serve the cities.

The first policing organization with the name "Carabiniers" was the Corps of Carabineros, in Spanish  (with similar meaning as the Italian ), formed in 1903 to bring law and order to the conflictive Araucanía region of Southern Chile (then much larger than today's region), formerly the Gendarme Corps, which would later be merged with the Army's 5th Carabineros Regiment and the Rural Police. The Carabinier Regiment was then a Chilean Army unit, thus the reason why the Carabineros of today sport military ranks and insignia. In 1908 the Carabineros' School (currently located in Providencia) was created, which until 1935 trained all officers and non-commissioned sworn personnel.

Carabineros de Chile (1927)
On April 27, 1927, President Carlos Ibáñez del Campo merged the Fiscal Police, the Rural Police, and the existing Corps of Carabineros to form the Carabineros de Chile, one unified, paramilitary and national security institution under the direction of the national government. The organization still carries the name given to it by Ibáñez, who became the Carabineros' first Director General. In 1929 its official coat of arms – two white crossed carbines in a green shield – was formally adopted. The service in 1930 became one of the pioneer mobile police forces in Latin America. By 1933 the Investigations Police of Chile was created in the basis of the investigations service. The roots of today's NCO School began in 1934 when in Santiago's Macul commune, the service's mounted command began training NCOs and enlisted personnel independently.

The Air Operations Prefecture, the air arm of the service, was raised in 1960.

In 1962 it became the first Chilean uniformed service to include women in its ranks. The next year, the Children and Fatherland Foundation was formed as its social responsibility arm for troubled kids and preteens.

Military dictatorship of Chile (1973–1990) 

In 1973, the Carabineros, headed by General Cesar Mendoza, later appointed Director General, joined the Chilean coup of 1973 under the lead of the Army, Navy and Air Force leaders, that overthrew President Salvador Allende. As such, the Carabineros' commander was a formal member of the Military Government Junta, as well as members of the institution taking on administrative roles, such as being in charge of the Ministry of Education.

In 1974, formal command of the service was handed over to the Chilean Ministry of National Defense, and it was integrated into the ranks and traditions of the Chilean Armed Forces as a result. Until 2011, this was the case for the service, from that year onward it is a part of the Ministry of the Interior and Public Security.

The Basic Training Center, which trains future personnel of the other ranks, was created in 1979.

2019–2020 protests 

The role of Carabineros during the 2019 Chilean protests has been the subject of several reports by human rights organizations due to their alleged use of deliberate excessive force. These organizations have also received reports of torture, sexual abuse and rape.

The National Institute of Human Rights (INDH) reported a total of 232 eye injuries by the 25th of November, 163 as a result of rubber bullets. Regarding the use of rubber bullets Sergio Micco, the director of the INDH, said that the organization had observed over 161 demonstrations in which they were used despite it being against protocol because of a lack of physical danger to carabineros.

Today
The Carabineros' mission is to maintain or re-establish order and security in Chilean society through civic education, service to the community, police work, and in a war situation, to act as a military force (all their members have military training). Under the current Chilean Constitution the Carabineros are integrated directly into the Armed Forces in a state of emergency to better guarantee the public order.

There is also an Elite Corps in charge of security in La Moneda Palace and for the President – the Presidential Guard Group whose cavalry troop is one of two horse guards units of the Republic, the latter having been raised recently and also serves as the youngest, and also sports a foot guards infantry battalion. The National Band of the Carabineros, the premiere representative marching band of the service (created in 1929), occasionally performs on state occasions and during the Guard Mounting at the La Moneda Palace and Citizenry Square on selected days with the Guard Group.

They travel in heavily armored trucks from which they can spray pressured water to attack protestors.

The Carabineros have recently replaced their Ruger P90 with the 9mm SIG P220. While most police forces issue the Chilean FAMAE revolver or the Brazilian Taurus Model 82, increasing numbers have adopted the Austrian Glock 17.

Emergencies
The emergency number of the police is 133 which is connected to the Central Communications (CENCO), closest to the nearest location of a police station.

This number will provide medical help, police or fire support. If one would need to communicate directly with any of these services this list of numbers will be useful:
 132: This number connects directly to the Fire Station closest to the residence concerned, under the Chilean National Firefighters Council's constituent fire services
 131: This number connects to the Emergency Medical Care Service or SAMU
 134: This number connects to the Investigations Police of Chile or PDI
 137: This number connects to the Maritime Rescue Unit (Navy)

Additional phone numbers are also designated to Central Communications for specific queries:

 135: drugs
 139: general information, weather and traffic
 147: child abuse and other related crimes
 149: family-related crimes

Aircraft inventory
Carabineros de Chile operate 35 aircraft in support of their operations, including 18 helicopters. Recently, 5 Augusta A109E have been acquired.

Aircraft in Service

Vehicles

Patrol cars

Motorcycles

Special operations (Grupo de Operaciones Policiales Especiales)

Chile Border Patrol

Ranks of the Chilean Carabineros

Enlisted personnel and non-commissioned officers
Chilean and foreign NCOs enter the service through enrollment at the Carabineros Formation School and receive further training as corporals at the Carabineros NCO Academy, both located in the Santiago Metropolitan Region, and some of them have later training at the various service schools of the Carabineros specializing in frontier defense, horsemanship and K-9 training and handling skills.
Carabinero alumno (Student Carabinier)
Carabinero (Carabinier)
Cabo Segundo (Second Corporal)
Cabo Primero (First Corporal)
Sargento Segundo (Sergeant)
Sargento Primero (First Sergeant)
Suboficial (Sub-officer)
Suboficial Mayor (Subofficer Major)

Commissioned officers
Officers of the Carabiners, native born or foreign officers having scholarships, start out as officer aspirants at the Carabinier Officers School "Pres. Gen. Carlos Ibanez del Campo"  in Santiago, and after graduating become sublieutenants either in Chile or in their home countries. Later training is provided by the Police Sciences Academy also in Santiago, and in the aforementioned specialty schools of the force.

General Directors

See also
La Moneda Palace Guard
Chilean Army
Chilean Navy
Chilean Air Force
Investigations Police of Chile
Chilean Gendarmerie
Crime in Chile

References

External links

Official website
Official Chilean Government Portal

1927 establishments in Chile
1927 in Chilean law
Gendarmerie
Government of Chile
National law enforcement agencies of Chile
Government agencies established in 1927
Carabineros de Chile